Calvin Drew Schiraldi (born June 16, 1962) is an American former professional baseball pitcher. He played in Major League Baseball (MLB) from 1984 through 1991 for five different teams. He is best remembered as the losing pitcher of Game 6 and Game 7 of the 1986 World Series, when he pitched for the Boston Red Sox.

Early years and amateur career
Schiraldi was born in Houston, Texas, and attended Westlake High School in Austin, Texas. He was drafted after high school by the Chicago White Sox in the 17th round of the 1980 Major League Baseball draft, but chose instead to attend the University of Texas. Schiraldi, along with future Boston Red Sox teammate Roger Clemens, pitched the  Texas Longhorns baseball team to a 1983 College World Series championship. Schiraldi was named the College World Series Most Outstanding Player and to the All-Tournament Team.

New York Mets
Following his performance in the College World Series, Schiraldi was selected by the New York Mets in the first round (27th pick) of the 1983 Major League Baseball draft. He made his major league debut on September 1, starting the second game of a double header against the San Diego Padres, and gave up five runs (four earned) in 3.1 innings. Schiraldi did not figure in the decision in that game. He made two more starts for the Mets that year, losing both.

Schiraldi split  between the Mets and Tidewater, earning his first major league win on April 22 against the St. Louis Cardinals. Following the season, Schiraldi was traded to the Red Sox along with John Christensen, Wes Gardner and La Schelle Tarver for Bob Ojeda, Tom McCarthy, John Mitchell and Chris Bayer.

Boston Red Sox
With the International League's Pawtucket Red Sox, Schiraldi was converted to a reliever. He made his debut with the big league club on July 20, . With no outs, runners on first and third, and the Red Sox already down 6-3 to the Seattle Mariners in the Kingdome, Schiraldi replaced Jeff Sellers in the sixth inning. He allowed both inherited base runners to score, and gave up an earned run of his own in the sixth. 
However, he pitched a perfect seventh.

He pitched again the next day, striking out four in  innings without giving up a run. He earned manager John McNamara's trust with similarly impressive performances on July 26 and August 1, and on August 3, with the Red Sox leading the Kansas City Royals, 5–3, Schiraldi entered in the ninth inning with runners on first and second and no outs. He struck out the first two batters he faced and retired the third for his first career save.

Whereas closing duties had been split between Bob Stanley and Joe Sambito up to that point, Schiraldi emerged as the Bosox's closer for the remainder of the season. He ended the season with a 4–2 record, nine saves, a 1.41 ERA and 55 strikeouts in 51 innings.

Schiraldi appeared in four of the seven games of the 1986 American League Championship Series against the California Angels. Although he took the loss in game four, he pitched respectably in the series, striking out five in the final two innings of game seven.

1986 World Series
After saving game one of the World Series, Schiraldi entered game six in the bottom of the eighth after Roger Clemens was lifted for a pinch hitter. The Red Sox were ahead, 3–2, but he gave up a game-tying sacrifice fly to Mets catcher Gary Carter. Schiraldi allowed the first two batters to reach base in the ninth but retired the next three. The Sox gave him a two-run lead when he took the mound in the tenth, three outs away from what would have been their first World Series title since 1918.

Schiraldi retired the first two batters but allowed three straight singles to Carter, Kevin Mitchell and Ray Knight. Knight's hit knocked in Carter to cut the Red Sox lead to 1 run. Schiraldi was replaced by Bob Stanley, who threw a wild pitch, which allowed Mitchell to score the tying run. Mookie Wilson followed by hitting a ground ball that rolled between the legs of Bill Buckner, scoring Knight and giving the Mets an improbable victory.

With the score tied, 3–3, in the seventh inning of game seven, Schiraldi gave up a leadoff home run to Knight, the series MVP. He gave up two more earned runs in just  of an inning to take the loss in the series clincher. His ERA for the World Series was 13.50.

Chicago Cubs
In , Wes Gardner, who also came over from the Mets in the Ojeda trade, emerged as the primary closer for the Red Sox, though Schiraldi did have six saves. Following the season, he and Al Nipper were traded to the Chicago Cubs for Lee Smith. The Cubs shifted him back to the bullpen in  before sending him to the San Diego Padres just before the August 30 traded deadline, with Darrin Jackson and a player to be named later for Luis Salazar and Marvell Wynne.

San Diego Padres
Schiraldi made four starts with the Padres in 1989, going 3–1 with a 2.53 ERA. Schiraldi went 3–8 with one save and a 4.41 ERA in 1990. The Padres released him during Spring training the following season. He hit two home runs during his stint with the Padres.

Texas Rangers
Schiraldi caught on with the Houston Astros following his release from the Padres. He was assigned to their triple A Pacific Coast League affiliate, the Tucson Toros, with whom he went 3–2 with a 4.47 ERA before being dealt to the Texas Rangers.

MLB statistics

Personal life
Schiraldi is the head coach of the baseball team at St. Michael's Catholic Academy in Austin, Texas, and coaches the 17U Texas Fire travel team. He is married to Debbie Murphy Schiraldi, whom he met in 1984 in Jackson, Mississippi, while pitching for the Jackson Mets, a Texas League Class AA affiliate of the New York Mets. That year Schiraldi went 14-3 for the championship squad. Calvin and Debbie Schiraldi have two children, Samantha and Lukas.

Calvin's son Lukas was signed in June 2014 by the Seattle Mariners and played in their minor league system until July 2017, when he was part of a trade to the Miami Marlins for David Phelps. Lukas was released by the Marlins' Jupiter Hammerheads in April 2019. Lukas played four years of baseball under coach and father Calvin at St. Michael's Catholic Academy, seeing time at catcher, first base, third base and pitcher; was named to the All-State team as a pitcher his senior season; and also played football and basketball. As his father had before him, Lukas pitched baseball for the University of Texas Longhorns, going 9-4 in the 2014 season.

Calvin wrote the book The Arena: The True Story of One Man's Search for Excellence and the Price He Paid for Daring to Acheive It about his upbringing, time spent at the University of Texas, his Major League career and post playing days.

References

External links

Calvin Schiraldi at Ultimate Mets Database

1962 births
Living people
New York Mets players
Boston Red Sox players
Chicago Cubs players
Texas Rangers players
San Diego Padres players
Sportspeople from Manhattan
Baseball players from New York City
Baseball players from Houston
Major League Baseball pitchers
Texas Longhorns baseball players
College World Series Most Outstanding Player Award winners
Lynchburg Mets players
Jackson Mets players
Tidewater Tides players
Pawtucket Red Sox players
Oklahoma City 89ers players
Tucson Toros players
All-American college baseball players
Westlake High School (Texas) alumni